Francisco Javier Álvarez Rosario (born 7 September 1967) is a Spanish sprint canoer who competed in the late 1980s. He was eliminated in the semifinals of the K-4 1000 m event at the 1988 Summer Olympics in Seoul.

Notes

References

External links
 
 
 
 

1967 births
Living people
Spanish male canoeists
Olympic canoeists of Spain
Canoeists at the 1988 Summer Olympics
Sportspeople from Badajoz
20th-century Spanish people